Lake Tetonkaha is a natural lake in South Dakota, in the United States.

Tetonkaha is a name derived from the Sioux language meaning "standing of the big lodging house".

See also
List of lakes in South Dakota

References

Lakes of South Dakota
Lakes of Brookings County, South Dakota